Glen Scott (born Glenvin Anthony Scott on 29 August 1973) is a British producer, arranger, mixing engineer, singer-songwriter, and session musician.

Glen Scott is currently living and working in London. He has worked with artists such as James Morrison, Mary J. Blige, Eric Bibb, James Blunt, Craig David, and Backstreet Boys.

Music career

Early career 
Glen Scott was born to Jamaican immigrants, his father a reverend and mother a teacher.

Glen Scott's early years were spent in North London where he was exposed to music at a very young age through his father's church. By the age of 11, he was playing both the Hammond organ and drums. At the age of 16, he began touring the world and recording with Dr. Robert from New wave Pop Rock band The Blow Monkeys.

1994–1999: first publishing and record deal 
After being extremely active as a young session musician in London, Glen Scott's songwriting and artist career began some 5 years later when he signed his first publishing deal with BMG at the age of 21. In 1996, he met up with Swedish producer and songwriter Martin Terefe and formed a songwriting partnership.

In 1997, Glen Scott signed a record deal with Sony Music/550 Music in New York City and in 1999 released his debut album Without Vertigo.

2012–present 
In October 2012, Glen Scott joined a community of talented and diverse writers, composers, session musicians and producers at Kensaltown Studios, West London where he currently resides.

In September 2013, Glen Scott produced Eric Bibb's acclaimed album Jericho Road. In October 2013, he joined Eric Bibb as music director on a three weeks tour of the UK.

In January 2014, Jericho Road was awarded the prestigious prize for Best Album in 2013 at the Academy of Jazz of Paris in France.

Discography and certifications

As solo artist

Studio albums
 Without Vertigo (1999) (Sony Music/550 Records)
 The Deafening Silence (2000) (Sodarock Entertainment)
 Do Something (EP) (2002) (Sony Music Japan)
 Soulrider (2002) (Sony Music Japan)
 Trust the Dawn Extended (2009) (Japan)
 Trust the Dawn (2012) (Hidden Beach Recordings)

Singles
 "Heaven" (1999) (Sony Music/550 Records)
 "Easy" (1999) (Sony Music Japan)
 "Deep in It" (2010) (Hidden Beach Recordings)

As musician/writer/producer

References

External links 
 Glen Scott Official Site
 Kensal Town Studios Official Site
 AllMusic.com
 discogs.com

1973 births
Living people
21st-century Black British male singers
English songwriters
English record producers
English multi-instrumentalists
English people of Jamaican descent
British male songwriters